Grognardo is a comune (municipality) in the Province of Alessandria in the Italian region Piedmont, located about  southeast of Turin and about  southwest of Alessandria.

Grognardo borders the following municipalities: Acqui Terme, Cavatore, Morbello, Ponzone, and Visone.

References

Cities and towns in Piedmont